Cordulephyidae is a small family of dragonflies occurring in Africa and Australia.
Members of Cordulephyidae can be small to tiny, black and yellow dragonflies.

The family Cordulephyidae is not recognised in the World Odonata List at the Slater Museum of Natural History, but rather its species are considered to be part of the Synthemistidae family.

Genera
The family includes the following genera:

 Cordulephya Selys, 1870
 Neophya Selys, 1881

References

 
Odonata families
Odonata of Australia
Taxa named by Robert John Tillyard